Marco Arpino (born 11 September 1966) is an Italian director at the Italian National Olympic Committee and a retired fencer. He competed in the foil events at the 1992 and 1996 Summer Olympics. He won a gold medal in the team foil event at the 1994 World Fencing Championships.

References

External links
 

1966 births
Living people
Italian male fencers
Olympic fencers of Italy
Fencers at the 1992 Summer Olympics
Fencers at the 1996 Summer Olympics
Fencers from Rome
Universiade medalists in fencing
Universiade gold medalists for Italy
Universiade silver medalists for Italy
Universiade bronze medalists for Italy
20th-century Italian people
21st-century Italian people